Sowar is a bimonthly photojournalism and documentary photography magazine published in Beirut, Lebanon. The word "sowar" is the phonetic pronunciation of the Arabic word meaning "pictures".

Profile
Sowar magazine launched in 2007, and is issued six times per year. Hassan Osman is the founder and editorial director of the magazine.

The focus of topics in Sowar magazine is mainly on events, cultures, individuals and scenes in Lebanon, the Middle East and the Gulf regions. The work of international photographers and photojournalists is presented in photo-essays. The magazine is picture-intensive, with most of the photos taking up the entire double spreads of the magazine's pages.

See also
List of magazines in Lebanon

References

2007 establishments in Lebanon
Arabic-language magazines
Bi-monthly magazines
Magazines established in 2007
Magazines published in Beirut
Photography in Lebanon
Photography magazines